This is a list of fictional novels either from or inspired by Murder, She Wrote.

During the series many novels that J.B. Fletcher wrote, were mentioned. Her first novel, The Corpse Danced at Midnight, was made into a film in one episode, and later in the series another was made into a theatre play. The novel A Killing at Hastings Rock also underwent development to become a virtual reality video game.

In keeping with the spirit of the TV show, a series of official original novels have been written and published by the New American Library. The co-author credited for all of the novels is the fictitious "Jessica Fletcher". The first novel, Gin & Daggers, authored by American ghostwriter Donald Bain, included several inaccuracies to the TV series including Jessica driving a car which she could not do as she never learned to drive. Due to fans pointing out the errors, the novel was republished in 2000 with most of the inaccuracies corrected.

The title The Stain on the Stairs had previously been used by Agatha Christie in The Murder at the Vicarage as the title of a supposed detective story.

Fictional novels 
Novels that were written by the fictional character of Jessica Fletcher (J.B. Fletcher) within the storyline of the series:

The Corpse Danced at Midnight
Dirge for a Dead Dachshund
A Faded Rose Beside Her
Murder on the Amazon
The Umbrella Murders
Murder at the Inn
Murder at the Digs
Murder in a Minor Key
The Stain on the Stairs
The Mystery of the Mutilated Minion
The Belgrade Murders
Sanitarium of Death
Calvin Canterbury's Revenge
Murder at the Asylum
Murder Comes to Maine
Ashes, Ashes, Fall Down Dead
Goodbye, Charlie
Yours Truly, Damian Sinclair
The Corpse That Wasn't There
The Messengers of Midnight
The Poison in My Heart
All the Murderers
Murder at the Ridge Top
The Corpse Swam by Moonlight
The Killer Called Collect
The Corpse at Vespers
The Triple Crown Murders
The Crypt of Death
A Killing at Hastings Rock
The Uncaught
Murder in White
The Dead Man Sang
Stone Cold Dead on Wall Street
Endangered
The Launch Pad Murders
Runway to Murder
The Venomous Valentine
A Case and a Half of Murder
The Zero Aspect

Novelizations 
A number of episodes were the basis for a series of novels released in the mid 1980s by Avon Books. The first three books in the series were written by James Anderson and the fourth was written by David Deutsch. Each book, with the exception of The Murder of Sherlock Holmes, utilizes two episodes from the show as the basis for its story.

James Anderson
The Murder of Sherlock Holmes (April 1985)
based on the two-hour pilot episode of the same name.
Hooray for Homicide (November 1985)
based on the episodes "Deadly Lady" and "Hooray for Homicide".
Lovers and Other Killers (February 1986)
based on the episodes "Lovers and Other Killers" and "It's a Dog's Life".

David Deutsch
Murder in Two Acts (April 17, 1986)
based on the episodes "Sing a Song of Murder" and "Murder in the Afternoon".

Spin-off novels
The following are novels inspired by the series, which are published by the New American Library. Donald Bain began writing the series in 1989 and continued authoring the books until his death in 2017. Bain's wife, Renée Paley-Bain (1945–2016), participated in writing the books beginning in 2002, and received a co-author credit for the final three books on which she worked. After Bain's death in 2017, author Jon Land was approached to take over the series. Bain had been working on the 47th book in the series, A Date with Murder, along with his grandson Zachary Bain Shippee. Land agreed to pick up where Bain left off and continue the series in his absence. A Date with Murder is Bain's final Murder, She Wrote novel, published posthumously and co-authored with Land. Land would go on to author six books in the series.

In 2020, it was revealed that author Terrie Farley Moran would be taking over the series beginning in 2021.

Jessica Fletcher and Donald Bain
Gin & Daggers (June 1989)
Second edition (April 2000)
Manhattans & Murder (December 1994)
Rum & Razors (April 1995)
Brandy & Bullets (August 1995)
Martinis & Mayhem (December 1995)
A Deadly Judgment (April 1996)
A Palette for Murder (October 1996)
The Highland Fling Murders (April 1997)
Murder on the QE2 (October 1997)
Murder in Moscow (May 1998)
A Little Yuletide Murder (October 1998)
Murder at the Powderhorn Ranch (May 1999)
Knock 'em Dead (October 1999)
Trick or Treachery (October 1, 2000)
Blood on the Vine (April 2001)
Murder in a Minor Key (October 2001)
Provence – To Die For (April 2002)
You Bet Your Life (October 2002)
Majoring in Murder (April 2003)
Destination Murder (October 7, 2003)
Dying to Retire (April 6, 2004)
A Vote for Murder (October 5, 2004)
The Maine Mutiny (April 5, 2005)
Margaritas & Murder (October 4, 2005)
A Question of Murder (April 4, 2006)
Three Strikes and You're Dead (October 3, 2006)
Coffee, Tea, or Murder? (April 3, 2007)
Panning for Murder (September 25, 2007)
Murder on Parade (April 1, 2008)
A Slaying in Savannah (September 30, 2008)
Madison Avenue Shoot (April 7, 2009)
A Fatal Feast (October 6, 2009)
Nashville Noir (April 6, 2010)
The Queen's Jewels (October 5, 2010)
Skating on Thin Ice (April 5, 2011)
The Fine Art of Murder (October 4, 2011)
Trouble at High Tide (April 3, 2012)
Domestic Malice (October 2, 2012)
Prescription for Murder (April 2, 2013)
Close-Up on Murder (October 1, 2013)
Aloha Betrayed (April 1, 2014)
Death of a Blue Blood (October 7, 2014)
Killer in the Kitchen (April 7, 2015)

Jessica Fletcher and Donald Bain with Renée Paley-Bain
The Ghost and Mrs. Fletcher (October 6, 2015)
Design for Murder (April 5, 2016)
Hook, Line, and Murder (October 4, 2016)

Jessica Fletcher and Donald Bain with Jon Land
A Date with Murder (May 1, 2018)

Jessica Fletcher and Jon Land
Manuscript for Murder (November 6, 2018)
Murder in Red (May 28, 2019)
A Time for Murder (November 26, 2019)
The Murder of Twelve (May 26, 2020)
Murder in Season (November 24, 2020)

Jessica Fletcher and Terrie Farley Moran
Killing in a Koi Pond (June 8, 2021)
Debonair in Death (November 2, 2021)
Killer on the Court (May 17, 2022)
Death on the Emerald Isle (January 3, 2023)

Fit for Murder (2024)

Anthologies
Beginning in 1997, a series of three anthologies were released, each featuring a number of stories by different authors. While none of the stories tied into the series (save for one story by Charlaine Harris in the first book, with Jessica Fletcher as a supporting character), each book was captioned as "Jessica Fletcher presents...", with the fictitious character being credited as the author of the book's introduction and making a short comment at the start of each story.

Murder, They Wrote (1997)
Murder, They Wrote II (1998)
More Murder, They Wrote (1999)

Young Adult novels
By the Time You Read This I'll Be Gone by Stephanie Kuehn (October 5, 2022)

References

Notes

External links
Murder She Wrote on the Penguin Random House website

Murder, She Wrote
Series of books
Novel series
Murder, She Wrote books